Erika Strößenreuther (5 August 1938 – 10 September 2021) was a German athlete. She competed in the women's javelin throw at the 1960 Summer Olympics. Strößenreuther died on 10 September 2021, at the age of 83.

References

External links
 

1938 births
2021 deaths
Athletes (track and field) at the 1960 Summer Olympics
German female javelin throwers
Olympic athletes of the United Team of Germany
Sportspeople from Munich